La Compañia  is a town and municipality in Oaxaca in south-western Mexico. The municipality covers an area of 93.13 km2. 
It is part of the Ejutla District in the south of the Valles Centrales Region.

As of 2005, the municipality had a total population of 3367.

References

Municipalities of Oaxaca